Anomalini is a tribe of shining leaf chafers in the family Scarabaeidae. There are about 1300 described species in Anomalini worldwide, including 60 in North America.

Selected genera
 Anomala Samouelle, 1819
 Anomalacra Casey, 1915
 Leptohoplia Saylor, 1935
 Mimela Kirby, 1823
 Popillia Dejean, 1821
 Rhinyptia Burmeister, 1844
 Strigoderma Burmeister, 1844

References

 Bouchard, P., Y. Bousquet, A. Davies, M. Alonso-Zarazaga, J. Lawrence, C. Lyal, A. Newton, et al. (2011). "Family-group names in Coleoptera (Insecta)". ZooKeys, vol. 88, 1–972.

Further reading

 Arnett, R. H. Jr., M. C. Thomas, P. E. Skelley and J. H. Frank. (eds.). (21 June 2002). American Beetles, Volume II: Polyphaga: Scarabaeoidea through Curculionoidea. CRC Press LLC, Boca Raton, Florida .
 
 Richard E. White. (1983). Peterson Field Guides: Beetles. Houghton Mifflin Company.

Rutelinae